Southern Huntingdon County High School\Middle School is a public middle & high school, located in Cromwell Township in southeastern Huntingdon County, Pennsylvania that houses about 700 students in grades 6-12 that reside in the twelve municipalities that make up the Southern Huntingdon County School District.

School History
The school's construction began on July 11, 1960 with first commencement exercises were conducted on June 1, 1962, combining seniors of Orbisonia and Saltillo High Schools. Occupancy of the school campus began on September 1, 1962 with dedication ceremonies held on November 4 of that same year. The building was renovated in 2004, adding a middle school to the building, after which the school was named its current name.

Principals

High School Principals

* Denotes an acting position

Middle School Principals

Athletics
Southern Huntingdon is in PIAA District 6

Sports for the middle school level (Grades 7 and 8) include:
Boys: Basketball, Football, Wrestling
Girls: Basketball. Softball

Vocational opportunities
Students in grades 10–12 have the opportunity to attend the Huntingdon County Career and Technology Center in Mill Creek.

References 

Buildings and structures in Huntingdon County, Pennsylvania
Schools in Huntingdon County, Pennsylvania
Educational institutions established in 1956
Public high schools in Pennsylvania
Public middle schools in Pennsylvania
1956 establishments in Pennsylvania
School buildings completed in 1962